The Dutch Tweede Divisie in the 1964–65 season was contested by 31 teams, sixteen of which playing in group A, fifteen in group B. DFC won the championship after beating Cambuur Leeuwarden in a play-off. Two teams would be promoted: the winners of the championship play-off and the winners of the following promotion competition. This way, it turned out that Xerxes (the number three of group B) would be promoted to the Eerste Divisie after SC Cambuur.

New entrants and group changes

Group A
Acquired football team:
 FC Zaanstreek (inherited professional licence from KFC)
Entered from the B-group:
 De Graafschap
 AGOVV Apeldoorn
 Vitesse Arnhem
 FC Wageningen
(Leeuwarden would play as SC Cambuur from this season onwards)

Group B
Relegated from the Eerste Divisie:
 Fortuna Vlaardingen
 BVV
Entered from the A-group:
 HVC
 HVV 't Gooi

Final tables

Group A

Group B

Play-offs
Several play-offs were held to determine the league champions, who would be promoted to the Eerste Divisie, and who would leave the Professional leagues altogether.

Championship play-off

SC Cambuur were promoted to the Eerste Divisie, while DFC entered the Promotion Tournament.

Best 3rd-place play-off

Xerxes entered the Promotion tournament.

Promotion tournament
To determine the second team to be promoted. Entering teams:
 the two 2nd-placed from the "regular season",
 the loser of the Championship play-off,
 and the winner of the Best 3rd-place play-off.

Group B 15th Place play-off

However, LONGA voluntarily relegated themselves to amateur football after the game.
Therefore, a replay, as well as a relegation play-off (involving bottom-finishers Zwolsche Boys from Group A), did not have to be played (while HVV 't Gooi moved to Tweede Group A next season).

See also
 1964–65 Eredivisie
 1964–65 Eerste Divisie

References
Netherlands - List of final tables (RSSSF)

Tweede Divisie seasons
3
Neth